Donor lymphocyte (or leukocyte) infusion (DLI) or buffy coat infusion is a form of adoptive immunotherapy used after hematopoietic stem cell transplantation.

History
Formerly, the only treatment option that offered relapsed bone marrow transplant patients hope of a cure was another bone marrow transplant. However, the risk of serious, life-threatening complications after a second BMT is great. One strategy of managing relapse, donor leukocyte infusion, might eliminate the need for a second BMT in some patients.

Procedure
Donor lymphocyte infusion is the infusion in which lymphocytes from the original stem cell donor are infused, after the transplant, to augment an anti-tumor immune response or ensure that the donor stem cells remain engrafted. These donated white blood cells contain cells of the immune system that can recognize and destroy cancer cells.

The goal of this therapy is to induce a remission of the patient's cancer by a process called the graft-versus-tumor effect (GVT). The donor T-cells can attack and control the growth of residual cancer cells providing the GVT effect. It is hoped that the donor leukocyte infusion will cause GVT and lead to a remission of the patients cancer. Patients might require standard chemotherapy, to reduce the amount of cancer cells they have prior to their donor lymphocyte infusion.

Complications
Complications of DLI include acute and chronic graft-versus-host disease and bone marrow aplasia, resulting in immunosuppression and susceptibility to opportunistic infections.

References

Further reading
 Thomas' Hematopoietic Cell Transplantation, ed. Blume KG, Forman SJ, Appelbaum FR. Blackwell Publishers, Cambridge, MA: 2004. .

Transplantation medicine
Cancer treatments